Below is a list of dishes found in Japanese cuisine. Apart from rice, staples in Japanese cuisine include noodles, such as soba and udon. Japan has many simmered dishes such as fish products in broth called oden, or beef in sukiyaki and nikujaga. Foreign food, in particular Chinese food in the form of noodles in soup called ramen and fried dumplings, gyoza, and western food such as curry and hamburger steaks are commonly found in Japan. Historically, the Japanese shunned meat, but with the modernization of Japan in the 1860s, meat-based dishes such as tonkatsu became more common.

Rice dishes

 Gohan or meshi: plainly cooked white rice. It is such a staple that the terms gohan and meshi are also used to refer to meals in general, such as Asa gohan/meshi ( breakfast), Hiru gohan/meshi ( lunch), and Ban gohan/meshi ( dinner). Also, raw rice is called kome ( rice), while cooked rice is gohan ( [cooked] rice). Nori, and furikake are popular condiments in Japanese breakfast. Some alternatives are:
  (karē raisu ): Introduced from the UK in the late 19th century, "curry rice" is now one of the most popular dishes in Japan. It is much milder than its Indian counterpart.
 Chāhan or yakimeshi (焼飯): fried rice, adapted to Japanese tastes, tends to be lighter in flavor and style than the Chinese version from which it is derived
 Genmai gohan: brown rice
 : thick beef stew on rice
 Kamameshi: rice topped with vegetables and chicken or seafood, then baked in an individual-sized pot
 Katemeshi: a peasant food consisting of rice, barley, millet and chopped daikon radish
 Mochi: glutinous rice cake
 Mugi gohan/: white rice cooked with barley
 Ochazuke: hot green tea or dashi poured over cooked white rice, often with various savory ingredients such as umeboshi or tsukemono.
 Okowa: cooked glutinous rice
 Omurice (Omu-raisu): omelet filled with fried rice, apparently originating from Tōkyō
 Onigiri: balls of rice with a filling in the middle. Japanese equivalent of sandwiches.
 Sekihan: white rice cooked with azuki beans to glutinous rice. (literally red rice)
 Takikomi gohan: Japanese-style pilaf cooked with various ingredients and flavored with soy, dashi, etc.
 Tamago kake gohan: Rice with a raw egg
 Tenmusu: a rice ball wrapped with nori that is filled with deep-fried tempura shrimp

Rice porridge
 Nanakusa-gayu is the long-standing Japanese custom of eating seven-herb rice porridge (nanakusa-gayu) on January 7 (Jinjitsu).
 Okayu is a rice congee (porridge), sometimes egg dropped and usually served to infants and sick people.
 Zosui (Zōsui) or Ojiya is a soup containing rice stewed in stock, often with egg, meat, seafood, vegetables or mushroom, and flavored with miso or soy. Some similarity to risotto and Kayu though Zosui uses cooked rice, as the difference is that kayu is made from raw rice.

Rice bowls
A one-bowl dish, consisting of a donburi ( big bowl) full of hot steamed rice with various savory toppings:
 Gyūdon: ( beef bowl): Donburi topped with seasoned beef and onion
 Katsudon: Donburi topped with deep-fried breaded cutlet of pork (tonkatsudon), chicken (chickendon)
 Oyakodon: Donburi topped with chicken and egg (or sometimes salmon and salmon roe) (literally Parent and Child bowl)
 Tekkadon: Donburi topped with tuna sashimi
 Tendon:: Donburi topped with tempura (battered shrimp and vegetables)
 Unadon:: Donburi topped with broiled eel with vegetables
 Wappameshi:: rice topped with other ingredients, cooked in wooden containers called wappa

Sushi

Sushi is a vinegared rice topped or mixed with various fresh ingredients, usually seafood or vegetables.
 Nigirizushi: Sushi with the ingredients on top of a block of rice.
 Makizushi: Translated as "roll sushi". Seasoned rice and seafood or other ingredients are placed on a sheet of seaweed (nori, dried laver) and rolled into a cylindrical shape, then sliced into smaller rounds. Typical ingredients are Tamagoyaki (Japanese-style omelette), simmered shiitake mushroom, boiled prawn and cucumber.
 Temaki orTemakizushi: Basically the same as makizushi, except that the nori is rolled into a cone-shape with the ingredients placed inside. Sometimes referred to as a "hand-roll".
 Chirashizushi or Bara-zushi: Translated as "scattered", chirashi involves fresh seafood, vegetables or other ingredients being placed on top of sushi rice in a bowl or dish.
 Inarizushi: Fried tofu packet braised in sweet soy sauce stuffed with sushi rice (no fillings)
 Oshizushi: A pressed sushi using cured or cooked fish, most commonly mackerel.
 : Sumeshi wrapped in Takana leaves. Unique to Wakayama Prefecture.

Other staples

Noodles (men-rui)
Noodles often take the place of rice in a meal. However, the Japanese appetite for rice is so strong that many restaurants even serve noodles-rice combination sets.

 Traditional Japanese noodles are usually served chilled with a dipping sauce, or in a hot soy-dashi broth.
 Soba: thin brown buckwheat noodles. Also known as Nihon-soba ("Japanese soba"). In Okinawa, soba likely refers to Okinawa soba (see below).
 Zaru soba: Soba noodles served cold
 Udon: thick white wheat noodles served with various toppings, usually in a hot soy-dashi broth, or sometimes in a Japanese curry soup.
 Miso-nikomi-Udon: hard udon simmered in red miso soup.
 Sōmen: thin white wheat noodles served chilled with a dipping sauce. Hot sōmen is called Nyumen.

 Chinese-influenced noodles are served in a meat or chicken broth and have only appeared in the last 100 years or so.
 Ramen: thin light yellow noodles served in hot chicken or pork broth with various toppings; of Chinese origin, it is a popular and common item in Japan. Also known as Shina-soba or Chūka-soba (both mean "Chinese-style soba").
 Champon: yellow noodles of medium thickness served with a great variety of seafood and vegetable toppings in a hot chicken broth which originated in Nagasaki as a cheap food for students.
 Hiyashi chūka: thin, yellow noodles served cold with a variety of toppings, such as cucumber, tomato, ham or chicken, bean sprouts, thin-sliced omelet, etc., and a cold sauce (soy sauce based, sesame based, etc.). The name means "cold Chinese noodles."
 Mazesoba (: wheat noodles served with a number of savory toppings, including raw egg, ginger, and meat
 Okinawa soba: thick wheat-flour noodles served in Okinawa, often served in a hot broth with sōki, steamed pork. Akin to a cross between udon and ramen.
 Yaki soba: Fried Chinese noodles.
 Yaki udon: Fried udon noodles.

Bread (pan)
Bread (the word "pan" is derived from the Portuguese pão) is not native to Japan and is not considered traditional Japanese food, but since its introduction in the 16th century it has become common.
 Curry bread (karē pan ): deep fried bread filled with Japanese curry sauce
 Anpan (ampan ): sweet roll filled with red bean (anko) paste
 Yakisoba-pan: bread roll sandwich with yakisoba (fried noodles and red pickled ginger) filling
 : bread roll sandwich with croquette (deep-fried patties mashed potato) filling
 Melon-pan: sweet round bun covered in a (sometimes melon flavored) cookie-like coating, scored in criss cross shape and baked
 : sandwich with tonkatsu (breaded pork cutlet) filling

Common Japanese main and side dishes (okazu)
 Okazu: Common Japanese main and side dishes

Deep-fried dishes (agemono)
 Agemono: Deep-fried dishes
  : bite-sized pieces of chicken, fish, octopus, or other meat, floured and deep fried. Common izakaya (居酒屋) food, also often available in convenience stores.
 : marinated fried fish.
 Korokke (croquette ): breaded and deep-fried patties, containing either mashed potato or white sauce mixed with minced meat, vegetables or seafood. Popular everyday food.
 Kushikatsu: skewered meat, vegetables or seafood, breaded and deep fried.
 Satsuma-age: fried fishcake (surimi), often used as an ingredient for oden.
 Tempura: deep-fried vegetables or seafood in a light, distinctive batter.
 Kakiage
 Tonkatsu: deep-fried breaded cutlet of pork (chicken versions are called chicken katsu).
 Agedashi dōfu: cubes of deep-fried silken tofu served in hot broth.

Grilled and pan-fried dishes (yakimono)

 Yakimono: Grilled and pan-fried dishes
 Gyoza: Chinese ravioli-dumplings (potstickers), usually filled with pork and vegetables (spring onion, leek, cabbage, garlic, and ginger) and pan-fried
 Kushiyaki: skewers of meat and vegetables
 Motoyaki: Baked seafood topped with a creamy sauce.
 Okonomiyaki are savory pancakes with various meat and vegetable ingredients, flavored with the likes of Worcestershire sauce or mayonnaise.
 Takoyaki: a spherical, fried dumpling of batter with a piece of octopus inside. Popular street snack.
 Teriyaki: grilled, broiled, or pan-fried meat, fish, chicken or vegetables glazed with a sweetened soy sauce
 Unagi, including Kabayaki: grilled and flavored eel
 Yakiniku ("grilled meat" ) may refer to several things. Vegetables such as bite-sized onion, carrot, cabbage, mushrooms, and bell pepper are usually grilled together. Grilled ingredients are dipped in a sauce known as tare before being eaten.
 Horumonyaki ("offal-grill" ): similar homegrown dish, but using offal
 Jingisukan (Genghis Khan ) barbecue: sliced lamb or mutton grilled with various vegetables, especially onion and cabbage and dipped in a rich tare sauce. A speciality of Hokkaidō.
 Yakitori: barbecued chicken skewers, usually served with beer. In Japan, yakitori usually consists of a wide variety of parts of the chicken. It is not usual to see straight chicken meat as the only type of yakitori in a meal.
  is flame-grilled fish, often served with grated daikon. Was one of the most common dishes served at home. Because of the simple cuisine, fresh fish in season are highly preferable. Some species traded as dried fish, such as hokke (Arabesque greenling) are also served this way.

Nabemono (one pot cooking)
Nabemono includes:
 Motsunabe: beef offal, Chinese cabbage and various vegetables cooked in a light soup base.
 Shabu-shabu: hot pot with thinly sliced beef, vegetables, and tofu, cooked in a thin stock at the table and dipped in a soy or sesame-based dip before eating.
 Sukiyaki: thinly sliced beef and vegetables cooked in a mixture of soy sauce, dashi, sugar, and sake. Participants cook at the table then dip food into their individual bowls of raw egg before eating it.
 : hot pot with fish and vegetables.
 : hot pot with blowfish and vegetables, a specialty of Osaka.
 Chigenabe or Kimuchinabe: hot pot with meat, seafood and vegetables in a broth seasoned with gochujang, and Kimchi.
 Imoni: a thick taro potato stew popular in Northern Japan during the autumn season
 Kiritanponabe: freshly cooked rice is pounded, formed into cylinders around Japanese cypress skewers, and toasted at an open hearth. The kiritanpo are used as dumplings in soups.
 Chankonabe: commonly eaten in vast quantity by sumo wrestlers as part of a weight-gain diet.

Nimono (stewed dishes)

Nimono is a stewed or simmered dish. A base ingredient is simmered in shiru stock flavored with sake, soy sauce, and a small amount of sweetening.
 Oden ( "kantou-daki"): surimi, boiled eggs, daikon radish, konnyaku, and fish cakes stewed in a light, soy-flavored dashi broth. Common wintertime food and often available in convenience stores.
 : chunks of pork belly stewed in soy, mirin and sake with large pieces of daikon and whole boiled eggs.
 : beef and potato stew, flavored with sweet soy.
 : fish poached in sweet soy (often on the menu as ).
 : Okinawan dish of pork stewed with bone.

Itamemono (stir-fried dishes)

Home grown stir fries include:
 Chanpurū: A stir-fry from Okinawa, of vegetables, tofu, meat or seafood and sometimes egg. Many varieties, the most famous being gōyā chanpurū.
 Kinpira gobo: Thin sticks of greater burdock (gobo) and other root vegetables stir-fried and braised in sweetened soy.

Sashimi

Sashimi is raw, thinly sliced foods served with a dipping sauce and simple garnishes; usually fish or shellfish served with soy sauce and wasabi. Less common variations include:
 Fugu: sliced poisonous pufferfish (sometimes lethal), a uniquely Japanese specialty. The chef responsible for preparing it must be licensed.
 : live sashimi
 : raw/very rare skipjack tuna or beef steak seared on the outside and sliced, or a finely chopped raw fish (Japanese jack mackerel or Sardine), spiced with the likes of chopped spring onions, ginger or garlic paste.
 : horse meat sashimi, sometimes called sakura, is a regional speciality in certain areas such as Shinshu (Nagano, Gifu and Toyama prefectures) and Kumamoto. Basashi features on the menu of many izakayas, even on the menus of big national chains.
 : chicken breast sashimi, regional specialty of Kagoshima, Miyazaki prefectures
  is typically liver of calf served completely raw (the rare version is called "aburi": あぶり). It is usually dipped in salted sesame oil rather than soy sauce.

Soups (suimono and shirumono)

The soups  (suimono and ) include:
 Miso soup: soup made with miso suspended in dashi, usually containing two or three types of solid ingredients, such as seaweed, vegetables or tofu.
 Tonjiru: similar to Miso soup, except that pork is added to the ingredients
 : soup made with dumplings along with seaweed, tofu, lotus root, or any number of other vegetables and roots
  or "osumashi": a clear soup made with dashi and seafood or chicken.
 Zōni: soup containing mochi rice cakes along with various vegetables and often chicken. It is usually eaten at New Years Day.

Pickled or salted foods (tsukemono)

These foods are usually served in tiny portions, as a side dish to be eaten with white rice, to accompany sake or as a topping for rice porridges.
 Ikura: salt cured and pickled soy sauce salmon roe.
 : Salt-cured cod roe or pollock roe
 : salt-cured and red pepper pickled pollock roe
 Shiokara: salty fermented viscera
 Tsukemono: pickled vegetables, hundreds of varieties and served with most rice-based meals
 Umeboshi: small, pickled ume fruit. Usually red and very sour, often served with bento lunch boxes or as a filling for onigiri.
 Tsukudani: Very small fish, shellfish or seaweed stewed in sweetened soy for preservation
 : vegetables such as cucumber or wakame, or sometimes crab, marinated in rice vinegar

Side dishes

 Bento or Obento is a combination meal served in a wooden box, usually as a cold lunchbox.
 Chawan mushi is meat (seafood and/or chicken) and vegetables steamed in egg custard.
 Edamame is boiled and salted pods of soybeans, eaten as a snack, often to accompany beer.
 : dried fish, often aji (Japanese jack mackerel). Traditionally served for breakfast with rice, miso soup and pickles.
 Hiyayakko: chilled tofu with garnish
 Nattō: fermented soybeans, stringy like melted cheese, infamous for its strong smell and slippery texture. Often eaten for breakfast. Typically popular in Kantō and Tōhoku but slowly gaining popularity in other regions in which nattō was not as popular
 : boiled greens such as spinach, chilled and flavored with soy sauce, often with garnish
 Osechi: traditional foods eaten at New Year
 Japanese salad dressings
 Wafu dressing: literally "Japanese-style dressing" is a vinaigrette-type salad dressing based on soy sauce, popular in Japan.
 : The so-called vinegar that is blended with the ingredient here is often sanbaizu ("three cupful/spoonful vinegar"), which is a blend of vinegar, mirin, and soy sauce.
 Shimotsukare:  made of vegetables, soybeans, abura-age ( or deep fried tofu skins) and sake kasu (rice pulp from fermented sake).

Chinmi

 are regional delicacies, and include:
 Ankimo
 Karasumi
 Konowata
 Mozuku
 Uni: specifically, salt-pickled sea urchin

Although most Japanese eschew eating insects, in some regions, locust and bee larvae are not uncommon dishes. The larvae of species of caddisflies and stoneflies, harvested from the Tenryū river as it flows through Ina, Nagano, is also boiled and canned, or boiled and then sautéed in soy sauce and sugar. ) is eaten as well in Hinoemata, Fukushima in early summer.

Sweets and snacks (okashi, oyatsu)

 Okashi, : Sweets and snacks

Japanese-style sweets (wagashi)

Wagashi include:
 Amanattō: traditional confectionery made of adzuki or other beans, covered with refined sugar after simmering with sugar syrup and drying.
 Dango: a Japanese dumpling and sweet made from mochiko (rice flour),[1] related to mochi.
 Hanabiramochi: a Japanese sweet (wagashi), usually eaten at the beginning of the year.
 Higashi: a type of wagashi, which is dry and contains very little moisture, and thus keeps relatively longer than other kinds of wagashi.
 Hoshigaki: dried persimmon fruit.
 Imagawayaki: also known as Taikoyaki, is a round Taiyaki and fillings are same.
 Kakigōri: shaved ice with syrup topping.
 Kompeito: crystal sugar candy.
 Manjū: sticky rice surrounding a sweet bean center.
 Matsunoyuki: a wagashi that resembles a pine tree dusted with snow.
 Mochi: steamed sweet rice pounded into a solid, sticky, and somewhat translucent mass.
 Oshiruko: a warm, sweet red bean (an) soup with mochi: rice cake.
 Uirō: a steamed cake made of rice flour.
 Taiyaki: a fried, fish-shaped cake, usually with a sweet filling such as a red bean paste.
 Namagashi: a type of wagashi, which is a general term for snacks used in the Japanese tea ceremony.

Old-fashioned Japanese-style sweets (dagashi) 
Dagashi include:
 Karume-yaki: Brown sugar cake that is also called "baked caramel".
 Sōsu senbei: Thin Senbei (rice crackers) eaten with brown sauce.
 Mizuame: Sticky liquid sugar candy.

Western-style sweets (yōgashi) 
 are Western-style sweets, but in Japan are typically very light or spongy.
 Kasutera: "Castella" Iberian-style sponge cake
 Mirukurepu: "mille feuilles": a layered crepe that literally means, "one thousand leaves" in French.

Sweets bread (kashi pan) 
 include:
 Anpan: bread with sweet bean paste in the center
 Melonpan: a large, round bun which is a combination of regular dough beneath cookie dough. It occasionally contains a melon-flavored cream, though traditionally it is called melon bread because of its general shape resembling that of a melon (not due to any melon flavor).

Other snacks

Snacks include:
 Azuki Ice - vanilla flavored ice cream with sweet azuki beans
 Koara no māchi
 Umai Bō - puffed corn food with various flavors
 Pocky
 Hello Panda
 Hi-chew
 Ice cream - usual flavors such as vanilla and chocolate are the most common. Distinctly Japanese ones include Matcha Ice (green tea ice cream), less common ones include Goma (black sesame seed) and sweet potato flavors.

Tea and other drinks

Tea and non-alcoholic beverages

 Amazake
 Genmaicha is green tea combined with roasted brown rice.
 Gyokuro: Gyokuro leaves are shaded from direct sunlight for approximately 3 weeks before the spring harvest. Removing direct sunlight in this way enhances the proportions of flavonols, amino acids, sugars, and other substances that provide tea aroma and taste. After harvesting the leaves are rolled and dried naturally. Gyokuro is slightly sweeter than sencha and is famous for its crisp, clean taste. Major growing areas include Uji, Kyōto and Shizuoka prefecture.
 Hōjicha: green tea roasted over charcoal
 Konbu-cha: specifically the tea poured with Kombu giving rich flavor in monosodium glutamate.
 Kukicha is a blend of green tea made of stems, stalks, and twigs.
 Kuzuyu is a thick herbal tea made with kudzu starch.
 Matcha is powdered green tea. (Green tea ice cream is flavored with matcha, not ocha.)
 Mugicha is barley tea, served chilled during summer.
 Sakurayu is an herbal tea made with pickled cherry blossoms.
 Sencha is steam treated green tea leaves that are then dried.
 Umecha is a tea drink with umeboshi, which provides a refreshing sourness.
 Kuwacha is a noncaffeinated tea made with white mulberry leaves.

Soft drinks

 Calpis
 C.C. Lemon
 Mitsuya Cider
 Oronamin C Drink
 Pocari Sweat
 Qoo
 Ramune
 Yakult

Alcoholic beverages
Sake is a rice wine that typically contains 12%–20% alcohol and is made by a double fermentation of rice. Kōjji fungus is first used to ferment the rice starch into sugar. Regular brewing yeast is used in the second fermentation to make alcohol. At traditional meals, it is considered an equivalent to rice and is not simultaneously taken with other rice-based dishes. Side dishes for sake is particularly called sakana, or otsumami  or ate .

Shōchū is a distilled beverage, most commonly made from barley, sweet potatoes, or rice. Typically, it contains 25% alcohol by volume.
 Awamori
 Sake
 Shōchū
 Umeshu
 Japanese beer - leading brands are Sapporo, Asahi and Kirin
 Japanese whisky - Suntory and Nikka Whisky Distilling are the leading distilleries

Imported and adapted foods

Japan has incorporated imported food from across the world (mostly from Asia, Europe and to a lesser extent the Americas), and have historically adapted many to make them their own.

Foods imported from Portugal in the 16th century 
 Kasutera — sponge cake, originating in Nagasaki.
 Konpeitō — star shaped sugar candy, the name comes from the Portuguese word  (comfit).
 Pan — bread, introduced by Portugal. (bread is pão in Portuguese.)  Japanese bread crumbs, panko, have been popularized by cooking shows.
 Tempura — so thoroughly adopted that its foreign roots are unknown to most people, including many Japanese. As such, it is considered washoku (native food).

Yōshoku
Yōshoku is a style of Western-influenced food.
 Breaded seafood or vegetables (derived from "fry"), and breaded meat (katsuretsu, derived from "cutlet" and often contracted to katsu), are usually served with shredded cabbage and/or lettuce, Japanese Worcestershire or tonkatsu sauce and lemon.  Tempura, a related dish, has been heavily modified since its introduction to Japan by use of batter and dashi-flavored dip, and is usually considered to be washoku.

  - breaded oyster
 Ebi furai - breaded shrimp
Korokke ("croquette" ) - breaded mashed potato and minced meat patties. When white sauce is added, it is called cream korokke. Other ingredients such as crab meat, shrimp, or mushrooms are also used instead of minced meat which are called kani-, ebi-, or kinoko-cream korokke, respectively.
Tonkatsu, Menchi katsu, chicken katsu, beef katsu, kujira katsu - breaded and deep-fried pork, minced meat patties, chicken, beef, and whale, respectively.
 Japanese curry - rice - imported in the 19th century by way of the United Kingdom and adapted by Japanese Navy chefs. One of the most popular food items in Japan today.  Eaten with a spoon. Curry is often eaten with pickled vegetables called fukujinzuke or rakkyo
 Curry Pan - deep fried bread with Japanese curry sauce inside. The pirozhki of Russia was remodeled, and Curry bread was made.
  - is a hot noodle dish where the soup is made of Japanese curry and dashi. May also include meat or vegetables.

  - beef and onions stewed in a red-wine sauce and served on rice
 Nikujaga - soy sauce-flavored meat and potato stew that has been made in Japan to the extent that it is now considered washoku, but again originates from 19th century Japanese Navy chefs adapting beef stews of the Royal Navy.
 Omu raisu - ketchup-flavored rice wrapped in omelet.

Other items were popularized after the war:
 Hamburg steak - a ground beef patty, usually mixed with breadcrumbs and fried chopped onions, served with a side of white rice and vegetables. Often accompanied with demiglace sauce. Popular post-war food item served at homes. Sometimes eaten with a fork.

 Spaghetti - Japanese versions include:
 with tomato ketchup, wieners, sliced onion and green pepper (called "naporitan" or "napolitan")
 with mentaiko sauce topped with nori seaweed (mentaiko spaghetti)
 with Japanese curry
 Pizza - The popular American pizza companies Domino's, Pizza Hut and Shakey's all operate in Japan, but Japanese brands such as Aoki's and Pizza-La are higher-grossing and famous for catering to Japanese taste. Many pizza chains offer seasonal toppings. Japanese versions include:
 with corn
 with shrimp, squid, or other seafood
 with mayonnaise, white sauce or Pesto basil sauce
 with potato or eggplant
 with Galbi beef or teriyaki chicken
 with hard-boiled eggs
 with macaroni, wieners or other prepared foods

Other homegrown cuisine of foreign origin 
 Japanese American cuisine
 Burgers have various variations in Japan. Domestic chains like MOS Burger and Freshness Burger cater to Japanese tastes with seasonal specials like Teriyaki Burgers and the kinpira rice burger.
 Korean cuisine
 Kimchi from Korea is often served with Japanese Chinese cuisine, though the local variant may use thinner cabbage.
 Japanese Chinese cuisine
 Gyoza are a very popular dish in Japan. Gyoza are the Japanese take on the Chinese dumplings with rich garlic flavor. Most often, they are seen in the crispy pan-fried form (potstickers), but they can be served boiled or even deep fried, as well.
 Japanese-only "Chinese dishes" like ebi chili (shrimp in a tangy and slightly spicy sauce)
 Mābō dōfu tends to be thinner than Chinese mapo doufu.
 Nikuman, anman, butaman and the obscure negi-man are all varieties of mantou with fillings.
 Ramen and related dishes such as champon and yaki soba
 Yakisoba-pan is a sandwich with a filling that resembles chow mein noodles. 
 Japanese English cuisine
 Purin is a version of caramel custard.

Adaptations 
 California roll - invented in Canada, then first introduced in California.
 Spam musubi - a snack from Hawaii resembling onigiri, made with Spam

Seasonings
Lots of Japanese foods are prepared using one or more of the following:
 Kombu (kelp), katsuobushi (flakes of cured skipjack tuna, sometimes referred to as bonito) and niboshi (dried baby sardines) are often used to make dashi stock.
 Negi (Welsh onion), onions, garlic, nira (Chinese chives), rakkyō (Allium chinense) (a type of scallion).
 Sesame seeds, sesame oil, sesame salt (gomashio), furikake, walnuts or peanuts to dress.
 Shōyu (soy sauce), dashi, mirin, sugar, rice vinegar, miso, sake.
 Wasabi (and imitation wasabi from horseradish), karashi (hot mustard), red pepper, ginger, shiso (perilla or beefsteak plant) leaves, sansho, citrus peel, and honeywort (called mitsuba).
 A citrus fruit called yuzu is also a frequent condiment, mashed up into a relish, sold as yuzukoshō and is blended with pepper/chili and salt. Yuzukoshō is eaten with many dishes, adding a flavorful kick to broth/soup items such as oden, nikujaga, tonjiru, udon as well as other dishes.  Yuzu is also seen to flavor teas, jams or zeri (jelly), and any number of sweets from yuzu-an (a type of bean paste) to yuzu-hachimitsu (yuzu-honey).

Less traditional, but widely used ingredients include:
 Monosodium glutamate, which is often used by chefs and food companies as a cheap flavor enhancer. It may be used as a substitute for kombu, which is a traditional source of free glutamate
 Japanese-style Worcestershire sauce, often known as simply "sauce", thicker and fruitier than the original, is commonly used as a table condiment for okonomiyaki, tonkatsu, croquette ("korokke") and the like.
 Japanese mayonnaise is used with salads, okonomiyaki, yaki soba and sometimes mixed with wasabi or soy sauce.

See also

 List of Japanese cooking utensils
 List of Japanese ingredients
 List of Japanese condiments
 List of Japanese desserts and sweets
 List of Japanese soups and stews

References 

Dishes
Japanese Dishes